Darian Forbes (born 3 May 1984) is a sprinter from Turks and Caicos Islands who specializes in the 200 metres.

Early life
Grew up in Grand Turk, Turks and Caicos Islands. He became the top sprinter throughout Inter-High, Inter-School, Annual Relays Competitions, competing for the H.J. Robinson High School.

After graduating he went to college to further his athletic passion.

Athletic career
He participated at the 2002 World Junior Championships, the 2003 World Championships and the 2006 Commonwealth Games, without ever progressing from the first round.

His personal best times:

(Outdoor)
100m - 10.46 seconds on 15 May 2005 in St. Charles, Missouri;
200m - 21.05 seconds on 8 July 2006 in Santo Domingo

(Indoor)
60m - 6.97 seconds on 6 February 2004 in Warrensburg, MO;
200m - 21.86 seconds on 10 March 2006 in Roxbury, MA;
400m - 50.12 seconds on 3 February 2006 in Bloomington, IN

Personal life 
Darian Forbes teaches as a sports teacher at the Enid Capron Primary School.

References

External links
 

1984 births
Living people
Turks and Caicos Islands male sprinters
Athletes (track and field) at the 2006 Commonwealth Games
Athletes (track and field) at the 2010 Commonwealth Games
World Athletics Championships athletes for Turks and Caicos Islands
Commonwealth Games competitors for the Turks and Caicos Islands